Chief Minister's Tamil Computing Award is an annual award given by Department of Tamil Development, Government of Tamil Nadu in the field of Tamil Computing. This will be presented by Tamil Nadu Chief Minister on occasion of literary awards -Chithirai Tamil New Year awards ceremony every Year. The Award comprises Rs one lakh, citation and certificate besides one sovereign gold medal.

Award Receipients

References 

Tamil Nadu awards
Computer-related awards